Payanam is a 2011 Indian action thriller film written and directed by Radha Mohan. It is simultaneously shot in Tamil and Telugu languages, the latter titled Gaganam. The plot of the film is based on a flight hijacking incident. It stars Nagarjuna, Prakash Raj, Poonam Kaur, Sana Khan, Rishi, Brahmanandam and Thalaivasal Vijay amongst others. Co-produced by Raj and Dil Raju, the film was released on 11 February 2011 to critical and commercial success. The Telugu version was later dubbed into Hindi as Mere Hindustan Ki Kasam in 2012 by Goldmines Telefilms.

Plot 
On a flight from Chennai to Delhi, five passengers retrieve weapons hidden in the toilet and use them to hijack the plane. An engine is damaged during the struggle with the pilots, so they make an emergency landing at Tirupati Airport. Government authorities arrive. The hijacker demanded 100 Crore (c. US $22,000,000), the release of their imprisoned leader Yusuf Khan, and a fresh aircraft for their escape.

National Security Guard Major N. Raveendran (Raveendra in Telugu) recalls the loss of a valued comrade at the shootout when he captured Yusuf Khan and regrets not killing Khan at the time. He urges the government to allow a commando operation, but officials fear risking passengers' life, not trusting Raveendra's team. The major is frustrated when the government vacillates, and it seems Khan might be released. Inside the flight, the passengers fall into groups discussing their past lives and religion. One of the terrorists becomes sentimentally attached to Afshana, a little girl returning to Karachi after her heart operation. The terrorist, however, is warned by his comrade to not become too attached as his main duty is to carry out the current tasks, which include killing the passengers, in the end, no matter what. Another passenger frequently irritates the terrorists with bitter questions about their motives, which he is supported by Jagdeesh, a retired army colonel. Time passes, and tensions rise until one of the passengers, Praveen (a drug addict), attempts an escape but is shot down by a terrorist who warns the authorities to act soon.

Ravindra's colleague Nawaz Khan discovers that the missing cleaner who prepared the toilet of the flight before its departure has been identified by Tamil Nadu Police. Ravi and Nawaz go to find the cleaner in the hope of getting information about the nature of the weapons that were left for the hijackers. After a chase in Red Hills, they capture the man, who confesses his involvement in the plot and also gives vague information about the size of the weapon he placed in the toilet. Ravi and Nawaz deduce that it must be a plastic explosive.

On his return, Ravi is told the government has decided to release Khan. But Khan dies in an accident while being transported to the airport. Ravi asks the officials to be very confident about this information so they can plan an assault without the terrorists' knowledge. However, a reporter disguises himself as an assistant to a senior police official, and so gets close to the aircraft. He records footage of the flight through his pen camera and overhears two officials talking about the accident of Khan in the restroom. The terrorists get alarmed. Despite attempts to contain the news, the media leak it, and one of the terrorists kills the passenger Subash, seeking proof that Yusuf is alive, failing which one passenger will be killed every half an hour. Ravi later arranges for Ranganath, who acted as Khan in a film, to pose as the real Khan, to make the terrorists believe Khan is alive and getting treated at a hospital.

Meanwhile, Ravi plans an operation to rescue the victims and names it Operation Garuda. Through a cleaning lady, he secretly sends a mobile phone onto the plane in a food packet, so he can exchange information with Colonel Jagadeesh. Ravi plans to shoot the terrorists during their transit to a new flight by asking the passengers to bend down when they get a signal. The firing succeeds, and four of the five terrorists are killed. The last terrorist is killed with the help of the passengers Chandrakanth and Vinod. The plastic explosive is found in Afshana's bag. Ravi throws it away, which explodes. The operation ends with the Prime Minister appreciating Ravi and the passengers heading to their destination.

The passengers happily take leave and farewell each other and agree to meet again. The terrorists' names are revealed to be Yasin (the leader), Munna, Omar, Anwar, and Abdul.

Cast and characters 

 Nagarjuna as Major N. Raveendran / Raveendra
 Prakash Raj as K. Vishwanathan / Vishwanath
 Ravi Prakash as Captain Girish
 Poonam Kaur as Air Hostess Vimala Gupta
 Brahmanandam as Director Rajesh Kapur
 Iqbal Yaqub as Yasin, leader of the terrorist gang
 Balaji K Mohan, Nitish, Sahil, and Prince as members of the terrorist gang 
 Narayan Lucky as Praveen, the drug addict
 Sricharan as Ranganath (acted as Yusuf Khan in climax)
 Bharath Reddy as Captain Nawaz Khan
 Melkote as S. K. Sharma, Spl. Secretary – Internal Security
 Laxmi Ratten as Krishnamurthy, National Security Advisor
 Harsha Vardhan as Reporter Srinivas
 Kovai Krishnan as  M. G. Menon, Joint Secretary - Kashmir

Flight passengers 

 Jayashree as Divya Prasad
 Sana Khan as Sandhya
 Rishi as Vinod
 Badava Gopi as Mimicry Artiste Gopinath
 Mohan V. Raman as Venkat Ram
 Sri Lakshmi as Venkat Ram's wife
 Babloo Prithiviraj as "Shining Star" Chandrakanth
 Kumaravel as Subash
 Afshana, a Muslim girl
 M. S. Bhaskar as Father Alphonse
 Thalaivasal Vijay as Colonel Jagadheesh
 Chaams as Balaji / Subba Rao
 Manobala as Astrologer Narayana Shastry

Production 
Radha Mohan, after directing the family-oriented romance and drama films Azhagiya Theeye, Mozhi and Abhiyum Naanum, decided to make a shift and produce an action thriller based on flight hijacking. He approached actor-producer Prakash Raj, a close friend and producer of all his earlier ventures, who agreed to fund this film as well, marking the fourth collaboration of the duo. Prakash Raj renamed his Duet Movies banner to Silent Movies, the logo and name of which were designed by Radha Mohan himself. Radha Mohan also decided to make it a bilingual venture, shooting the film in both Tamil and Telugu languages simultaneously, and was able to convince noted Telugu film producer Dil Raju to produce the Telugu version, titled Gaganam, whilst roping in Nagarjuna, who is a known name in both film industries, to enact the lead role of a NSG commando. Speaking about his role, Nagarjuna revealed that the film turned out to be "one of the easiest" he had worked in as he didn't have to prepare much for the role, since Radha Mohan and Prakash Raj had done "so much research", spoken to army officers and had "everything about the role on paper – how commandos behave and dress." Nagarjuna, starring in his first direct Tamil film after 13 years, was part of an ensemble cast that featured around 45 known artists from both Tamil and Telugu industries, with the cast being retained for both versions. Prakash Raj himself, who had also previously starred in all Radha Mohan films, was cast in a pivotal role. He considered Babloo Prithiveeraj's character Chandrakanth, a Superstar, to represent "all falsehood in our cinema".

Despite widespread report that the film was based on the 1999 Kandahar hijacking incident of the Indian Airlines Flight 814, Prakash Raj had denied the reports, making clear that it was about a hijack that takes place at the Tirupati Airport. A grand set resembling the Tirupati airport was erected at the Ramoji Film City in Hyderabad, Andhra Pradesh by art director Kathir. The airport set was constructed within one month and reportedly costed ₹3 crores, which was almost 20% of the films' entire budget and included runway, traffic, ATC room and two planes with "perfect interiors". The film was shot using the RED camera, handled by cinematographer K. V. Guhan. Pravin Mani was assigned as the film composer, who worked on the film's background score. The film would feature only one solo song, which too was composed by Pravin and was written by Vairamuthu's son Madhan Karky. The trailer of the film was launched on 14 January 2011.

Soundtrack 
The film did not have an original soundtrack, a notable rarity in Tamil and Telugu cinemas. However, Madhan Karky had penned the lyrics for a promotional song, which was also the film's only song. Pravin Mani scored the film's background score. According to the director Radha Mohan, "We did not have songs in the film because there are no situations in the film which warranted songs. Hence we decided to do away with songs in the film."

Reception 
The film opened to mainly positive reviews. The story and screenplay by Radhamohan were well appreciated. Rediff.com gave the film 3.5 out of5 and stated that "The sequences are logical, even while allowing for dashes of humour, soul-searching, and feel-good factors; the whole setting has a realistic feel that draws you in". Nowrunning.com also gave 3.5 out of5 and wrote "Payanam has come out as something new for Tamil cinema. It's worth watching." Southdreamz expressed that "Payanam is a movie that can be watched for a different experience." Indiaglitz also praised the film stating "Kudos to Payanam for a great successful journey." Another review website gave 3.5 out of5 stated "The movie has the necessary elements which can be called the director's touch." National Award-winning critic Baradwaj Rangan wrote "You could call Payanam a cross between a disaster movie (say, Airport) and a Mouli stage play. There's such an air of bonhomous familiarity to those who grew up in the seventies and the eighties, reading Vikatan jokes about actresses named Kalasri." Sify.com stated that "The film's supporting cast is what makes it work. On the whole, Radha Mohan's Payanam is an enjoyable ride." Chennai Online praised the attempt for inserting comedy in the action sequences saying "A big plus is a comedy in the script with the various characters from all backgrounds from a star to an astrologer, all thrown together in the aircraft." The Hindu noted that "The film grabs audience attention from the word go —you're worried about the plight of the passengers one minute, chuckling the very next at the wry humour, and before long, gripped by the suspense." admiring the art director stating "The aircraft and airport are apparently a set. Really? Art director Kathir, take a bow!" and further cited that "As the end credits roll, you only wish there had been a Major Raveendran who had his way in December 1999 at Amritsar!"

In contrast, the film also received mixed and negative reviews. A critic from the Times of India gave 2.5 out of5 and said that "Radhamohan's 'Payanam' would have been a more engaging watch only if the journey was a littler shorter". Behindwoods gave it2 out of5 and said that "Although humour shares equal space with action and suspense, a slight swaying on the lighter side dilutes the serious effect a wee bit which could have been taken care of." One India commented, "The film appears a little nagging and boring because the audiences continue to expect a big action scenes but the film continues to roll without any such incident."

Box office 
The film collected  in Chennai in the first week and had an average opening.

Awards and nominations

See also 
Kandahar (2010 film), a Malayalam film also dealing with a flight hijacking incident, but a different story.

References

External links 
 
 

2011 films
2010s Telugu-language films
Indian multilingual films
Indian aviation films
Indian action thriller films
2011 action thriller films
Films set on airplanes
2010s Tamil-language films
Films about aircraft hijackings
Films about aviation accidents or incidents
2011 multilingual films
Films directed by Radha Mohan
Sri Venkateswara Creations films
2000 millennium attack plots
Films about jihadism
Films about terrorism in India
Indian films based on actual events